The Journal of Machine Learning Research is a peer-reviewed open access scientific journal covering machine learning. It was established in 2000 and the first editor-in-chief was Leslie Kaelbling. The current editors-in-chief are Francis Bach (Inria) and David Blei (Columbia University).

History 
The journal was established as an open-access alternative to the journal Machine Learning. In 2001, forty editorial board members of Machine Learning resigned, saying that in the era of the Internet, it was detrimental for researchers to continue publishing their papers in expensive journals with pay-access archives. The open access model employed by the Journal of Machine Learning Research allows authors to publish articles for free and retain copyright, while archives are freely available online.

Print editions of the journal were published by MIT Press until 2004 and by Microtome Publishing thereafter. From its inception, the journal received no revenue from the print edition and paid no subvention to MIT Press or Microtome Publishing.

In response to the prohibitive costs of arranging workshop and conference proceedings publication with traditional academic publishing companies, the journal launched a proceedings publication arm in 2007 and now publishes proceedings for several leading machine learning conferences, including the International Conference on Machine Learning, COLT, AISTATS, and  workshops held at the Conference on Neural Information Processing Systems.

Further reading

References

External links

Computer science journals
Open access journals
Machine learning
Publications established in 2000